The St Kilda and Brighton Railway Company was a railway company in Victoria, Australia. The company opened a line from St Kilda Railway Station (via an elevated loop) in Melbourne, Australia to Bay Street (now North Brighton) in 1859 and Beach (now Brighton Beach) in 1861.

In November 1853, a bill was introduced in the Parliament of Victoria for incorporation of a company to be called the "Melbourne, St. Kilda and Brighton Railway Company". Then, in December 1855, it was announced that another bill would be presented to Parliament to incorporate the "St. Kilda and Brighton Railway Company". Charles Ebden was chairman of directors of the company.

The St Kilda and Brighton Railway Company and the more extensive Melbourne (and Suburban) Railway Company, with lines to Prahran and Hawthorn, were taken over by the Melbourne and Hobson's Bay Railway Company in 1864. The combined company, known as the Melbourne and Hobsons Bay United Railway Company, was taken over by the Government of Victoria in 1878 and the lines became part of the Victorian Railways.

Rolling stock

Locomotives

References

Defunct railway companies of Australia
Australian companies established in 1855
Railway companies established in 1855